The Glassworker is an upcoming Pakistani Urdu-language animated film directed by Usman Riaz. It is Pakistan's first hand-drawn animated film and 5th animated film produced in Pakistan. The Kickstarter, to produce a pilot animation for the film was launched in February 2016,. The pilot was completed in 2018 and full-scale production of the film officially began in January 2019. The film is currently in production and is being produced by Mano Animation Studios located in Karachi.

'The Glassworker' is set to be released in 2023 (International) as described on the one pager of Mano Animation Studios on their website.

Plot
‘The Glassworker’ is an original story about young Vincent and his father Tomas, who run the finest glass workshop in the country and find their lives upended by an impending war in which they want no part.

The arrival in their town of an army colonel and his young, talented violinist daughter, Alliz, shakes their reality and tests the relationship between father and son.

The love that develops between Vincent and Alliz is challenged constantly by the differing views of their fathers. It is a time when patriotism and social standing are considered more important than free thought and artistic pursuits. It is a time when love is not relevant.

Set in a location loosely inspired by Pakistan, ‘The Glassworker’ is a hand-drawn animated feature film directed by Usman Riaz and created by Mano Animation Studios.

Voice cast
English version voice actors:
 Sacha Dhawan as Vincent Oliver
 Anjli Mohindra as Alliz Amano
 Art Malik as Tomas Oliver
Urdu version voice actors:
 TBA

Production

Development
Usman Riaz crowd sourced funding and raised $116,000 via a Kickstarter campaign.

Mano Animation Studios
Mano Animation Studios is Pakistan's first hand-drawn animation studio.

Co-Founded by Usman Riaz, the studio, based in Pakistan, employs a select group of talented artists and creatives working to produce their first feature film, ‘The Glassworker’.

The Mano team has built a collaboration network that extends to Malaysia, the Philippines, Japan, Peru, Argentina, Spain, the United States, and the United Kingdom.

Inspiration
Many buildings in the movie are inspired from the colonial buildings of the mega city Karachi. While in The town of waterfront, The bazaar is inspired from the empress market located in Karachi. The clothing of the Men in the movie have a lot of similarities of the clothing wore by the men in the Pakistani Province of KPK and Gilgit Baltistan while the women clothing is inspired from the national dress of Pakistan "Shalwar kameez"

See also 

 List of Pakistani animated films

References

External links
 
 
Mano Animation Studios official website
Mano Animation Studios Official YouTube Channel

Pakistani animated films